Syed Zahid Ahmed Naqvi (born 15 November 1961, Karachi, Sindh) is a former Pakistani cricketer who played two ODIs in 1987.

References

1961 births
Living people
Cricketers from Karachi
Pakistan One Day International cricketers
Pakistani cricketers
Pakistan International Airlines cricketers
Karachi Blues cricketers
Karachi Whites cricketers
Karachi cricketers
Peshawar cricketers
Faisalabad cricketers
Hyderabad (Pakistan) cricketers